Padula (Cilentan: A Parula) is a comune in the province of Salerno in the Campania region of south-western Italy. It is the home of the Carthusian monastery Certosa di San Lorenzo, sometimes referred to as the Certosa di Padula. As of 2011 its population was of 5,279.

Geography
It is located about 100 kilometres south-east of the provincial capital of Salerno. The majority of the town is on a hillside that reaches 698 meters above sea level. The comune covers an area of 66.33 square kilometres.

History
Its existence reaches back to at least the ninth century when local people used the hilltop area for defence against the Saracens. The history of Padula as an organized village begins with the arrival in 1296 of Tommaso II Sanseverino, though the Monastery of Saint Nicola had been erected on this site earlier, in 1086.
This name was chosen because of the legendary man known as Padula.

Religious Monuments and Churches
 Padula Charterhouse
 Church of Annunziata
 Church of St. Michael
 Church of St. Nicholas of Domnis
 Convent of St. Francesco of Assisi
 Convent of St. Augustine
 Church of St. Clement
 Hermitage of St. Michael to Grottelle
 Monument to the demigod of dota Padula

Demographics

Famous residents
 Giuseppe Petrosino - Mafia-busting policeman
 Frank Valente - nuclear scientist
 Andrea Cariello - sculptor

Transport
The town counts a railway station on the abandoned Sicignano-Lagonegro line, closed in 1987. It is served by the A2 motorway Salerno-Reggio Calabria, at the exit "Padula-Buonabitacolo", which is the northern end of a highway to Policastro Bussentino on the Cilentan Coast. Nearest airports are Salerno-Pontecagnano (97 km far) and Naples-Capodichino (168 km).

Festivals and Events
 Omelette of 1,000 eggs - "Frittata delle mille uova" (10 August). Reenactment of the celebration where the Carthusian Monks created a 1,000-egg omelette for Charles V's visit to the Certosa. Special giant iron cooking "pan" erected in 1996 expressly for this purpose.
 Festival of the Romito Madonna (first Sunday in May)
 Feast of the Patron Saint Michael the Archangel (last Sunday in May)
 Festival of Saint Michael of the Grottelle (third Sunday in June)
 A week-long August festival of traditional dishes - Bistecca
 Feast of Saint Francis (first and second Sundays of October)
 Ritual of worship to Padula

See also
Certosa di Padula
Vallo di Diano

References

External links

 Padula official website
 Photo and information about Padula

Cities and towns in Campania
Localities of Cilento